Lorenz Possa (31 March 1934 – 8 January 2013) was a Swiss cross-country skier. He competed in the men's 15 kilometre event at the 1960 Winter Olympics.

References

External links
 

1934 births
2013 deaths
Swiss male cross-country skiers
Olympic cross-country skiers of Switzerland
Cross-country skiers at the 1960 Winter Olympics
People from Leukerbad
Sportspeople from Valais